Zahradnik or Zahradník is a surname. Notable people with the surname include:

11408 Zahradník, main belt asteroid with an orbital period of 2059
Karel Zahradnik (1848–1916), Czech mathematician at the University of Zagreb
Miloš Zahradník (born 1951), Czech mathematician who works on statistical mechanics in Charles University in Prague
Rudolf Zahradník (1928–2020), Czech chemist
Stanisław Zahradnik (born 1932), Polish historian

See also 
Záhradné
Zahradníček (cs)
Zahrádkář (cs)

Czech-language surnames